Iaqua (also, Jaqua) is a former settlement in Humboldt County, California.

The Jaqua post office opened in 1880, and changed its name to Iaqua later that year. The post office closed in 1903, re-opened in 1909, and closed for good in 1920.

As of 1873, a school was in operation at Iaqua. It later merged with the Kneeland School.

References

Former settlements in Humboldt County, California
Former populated places in California
Forts in California
American Civil War army posts
1863 establishments in California